The following is a list of Australian films released in the year 1990.

1990

See also 
 1990 in Australia
 1990 in Australian television

References

External links 
 Australian film at the Internet Movie Database

1990
Lists of 1990 films by country or language
Films